Christina Hendricks is an American actress of film, stage, television and video games, whose accolades include six Primetime Emmy Award nominations, and two Screen Actors Guild Awards. Hendricks began her career as a model in the early 1990s before transitioning into acting in commercials. Her first substantial role was on the MTV series Undressed (1999), after which she was cast in the series Beggars and Choosers (1999–2001).  After appearances on Firefly (2002–2003) and several other series, she was cast as Joan Holloway on the AMC series Mad Men (2007–2015), which earned her a total of six Emmy Award nominations over its seven-season run, as well as two Screen Actors Guild Awards for Best Ensemble.

While starring on Mad Men, Hendricks ventured into film, appearing in several independent features before being cast in a supporting part in Nicolas Winding Refn's thriller Drive (2011). Other film credits during this period include Sally Potter's Ginger & Rosa (2012), and Ryan Gosling's directorial debut Lost River (2014), in which she played the lead. Following Mad Mens conclusion, Hendricks reunited with Refn for a minor role in his horror film The Neon Demon (2016), as well as starring on the Comedy Central series Another Period (2015–16). Subsequent film credits include the horror slasher film The Strangers: Prey at Night (2018), the drama American Woman (2019), and the Disney animated sequel Toy Story 4 (2019). Hendricks has also appeared on television with roles in the anthology series The Romanoffs (2018), the crime drama series Tin Star (2017–19), and the NBC comedy series Good Girls (2018–21).

Screen

Film

Television

Video games

Stage

References

External links
 

Actress filmographies
American filmographies